The Sa'd al-Saltaneh Caravanserai (سعد السلطنه) is a large Caravanserai located in the city of Qazvin in Qazvin Province of Iran.

Built during the Qajar era, the caravanserai is one of Iran's best preserved urban caravanserais. The builder (patron) of this large caravanserai was a person by the name Sa'd al-Saltaneh Isfahani (آقا باقر سعد السلطنه اصفهاني), after whom the caravanserai is named.

The caravanserai is built on a square plan, has 4 iwans facing a courtyard. The interiors are decorated with Muqarnas and Rasmi bandi.

The Hujrehs, or the rooms for the travelers, are situated one meter above the courtyard ground level. The Hashti behind the southern iwan has the largest gonbad, with 4 semi-domes adjacent to it.

The eastern-western axis of the Hashti is called Dalan-i Qeisariyeh (دالان قيصريه ) or "Caesar's Hall", and the north-south axis of the Caravanserai's Hashti is named Dalan-i Ghahremani (دالان قهرماني) or "Ghahremani Hall". The former is connected to the "Bazaar of Vizir" of the city.

There are also two smaller courtyards in the east and west of the Caravanserai.

Gallery

See also
Architecture of Iran

References

External links

Buildings and structures completed in the 19th century
Caravanserais in Iran
Qazvin
Buildings and structures in Qazvin Province
National works of Iran
Buildings of the Qajar period